The Commonwealth Heads of Government (CHOG) is the collective name for the government leaders of the nations with membership in the Commonwealth of Nations. They are invited to attend Commonwealth Heads of Government Meetings every two years, with most countries being represented by either their head of government or head of state.

Current heads

See also
 Commonwealth Heads of Government Meeting
 List of current viceregal representatives of the Crown
 List of prime ministers of Elizabeth II
 List of prime ministers of Charles III
 List of Privy Counsellors (1952–2022)

References

Heads of government